"The Great Rock 'n' Roll Swindle" is the title song of The Great Rock 'n' Roll Swindle movie soundtrack album.

The single was released on 12 September 1979 and featured vocals by Edward Tudor-Pole on both sides.

Recording
According to producer Dave Goodman, both songs were recorded at The Who's Ramport Studios with himself playing bass on both tracks. According to Edward Tudor-Pole, the song originally featured lead vocals by Steve Jones.

The final vocals were recorded live on the second day of an audition for singers specially filmed for inclusion in The Great Rock 'n' Roll Swindle movie. Vocal takes by Edward Tudor-Pole and three others were recorded and later edited together. According to the soundtrack album record sleeve, filming and recording took place at the Duchess Theatre in June 1978, however John Lydon wrote in his autobiography that it was actually the Rainbow Theatre in Finsbury Park near his parents' home.

Vocals for the B-side, “Rock Around The Clock”, were recorded several weeks later.

Charts
The single spent 6 weeks in the UK Top 75, peaking at #21 on 13 October 1979.
Virgin Records also released the single in the Netherlands and West Germany, but it did not chart.

Covers
The song was covered by several bands, including Chaotic Dischord, Lolita No.18, Niblick Henbane, Rumble Militia

References

1979 singles
Sex Pistols songs
Songs written by Paul Cook
Songs written by Steve Jones (musician)
Virgin Records singles
1978 songs